Ura Gewog is a gewog (village block) of Bumthang District, Bhutan. Ura Gewog consists of ten major villages- Tangsibi, Shingnyeer, Shingkhar, Pangkhar, Somthrang, Beteng, Trabi, Tarshong, Toepa and Chari with total household of 301 and population of 2288, covering an area of around 265 sq. kilometer with some 82% of forest coverage. The Gewog is located in the southeastern part of Bumthang District, 48 km distance from Dzongkhag Offices. It is bordered by Chhokhor and Chhumig gewog to the west, Tang gewog to the north, Zhemgang and Mongar District to the south and Lhuentse District to the east. The altitude of the gewog is around 3100 meters above sea level.

References

Gewogs of Bhutan
Bumthang District